The Coweta American is a weekly newspaper in Coweta, Oklahoma that publishes on Friday. It is published by Community Publishers Inc., a newspaper and Internet publisher and commercial printer that serves Oklahoma, Missouri and Arkansas. The newspaper was established in 1986 and is currently edited by Christy Wheeland.

The Coweta American has earned recognition from the Oklahoma Press Association for excellence in news writing, layout and design, news content, feature writing, photography, sports coverage, sales promotions and advertising.

The publication has also been honored with the Small Newspaper Award from the Oklahoma Chapter of Disabled American Veterans for its complete coverage of veterans' issues.

References

External links
CowetaAmerican.com

Newspapers published in Oklahoma
Newspapers established in 1986